The Ding Sheng BHW Taiwan Central Plaza is a skyscraper office building located in Taichung's 7th Redevelopment Zone, Xitun District, Taichung, Taiwan. Construction of the building began in 2012 and it was completed in 2015. The building is designed by EHS ArchiLab and Hsuyuan Kuo Architects & Associates and located next to the Tiger City shopping mall. As of February 2021, it is the 14th tallest building in Taichung and 43rd tallest in Taiwan.

See also 
 List of tallest buildings in Taiwan
 List of tallest buildings in Taichung
 Taichung's 7th Redevelopment Zone
 Tiger City

References

2015 establishments in Taiwan
Skyscraper office buildings in Taichung
Office buildings completed in 2015
Taichung's 7th Redevelopment Zone